Bernadette Anne McKenna, (born 20 January 1971) also known as Dr. Pixie McKenna, is an Irish doctor and television personality. She currently runs a clinic in Cork, Ireland and is best known for her work on the Channel 4 series Embarrassing Illnesses and its successor series Embarrassing Bodies and BBC Three's Freaky Eaters.

Education and training 
Born in Ireland, McKenna attended medical school at University College Cork, Ireland graduating in 1995.

After qualifying as a general practitioner in 1999, McKenna moved to the UK and practised in Notting Hill, London for three years. She then set up a GP practice in Ireland while continuing sessional work at Harley Street. In the public sector, she acts as a clinical assistant in sexual health and dermatology for the NHS and has worked at a number of London teaching hospitals.

Media: Television and radio career
In 2007 McKenna began to appear on Freaky Eaters, a show which helps individuals overcome eating disorders. That same year she went on to co-present Embarrassing Illnesses, a show which highlights common conditions that people are reluctant to discuss with their doctors, and in 2008 co-presented with Christian Jessen its sister series Embarrassing Bodies. This has, on numerous occasions, led her onto The Ray D'Arcy Show on Today FM to discuss the various embarrassing illnesses endured by the programme's listeners.

References

External links

1971 births
Living people
British television presenters
Irish general practitioners
Radio personalities from the Republic of Ireland
Television presenters from the Republic of Ireland
The Ray D'Arcy Show
Alumni of University College Cork